Mary Tate was an African American evangelist.

Mary Tate may also refer to:

Mary Tate, a character in Studio 60 on the Sunset Strip
Mary Tate, character in Stay Hungry
Mary Tate, character in Miami (1924 film)
Mary Tate, character in Da (play)

See also
Mary Tate Engels, American writer